Izhberdino (İşbirźe) is a rural locality (a selo) in Izhberdinsky Selsoviet, Kugarchinsky District, Bashkortostan, Russia. The population was 150 as of 2010. There are 3 streets.

Geography 
Izhberdino is located 29 km south of Mrakovo (the district's administrative centre) by road. Bustubayevo is the nearest rural locality.

References 

Rural localities in Kugarchinsky District